Peter F. Michelson is an American physicist who focuses on high energy astrophysics, particularly X-ray and gamma-ray observations and instrument development. He is currently the Luke Blossom Professor in the School of Humanities and Sciences at Stanford University.

References

Year of birth missing (living people)
Living people
Stanford University faculty
21st-century American physicists
Santa Clara University alumni
Stanford University alumni